Against the Elements is the debut album by American melodic death metal band Beyond the Embrace.

Track listing

Personnel 
 Shawn Gallagher – vocals
 Alex Botelho – guitar
 Jeff Saude – guitar
 Oscar Gouveia – guitar
 Dan Jagoda – drums
 Chris Parlon – bass

References

2002 albums
Beyond the Embrace albums